Selliner See may refer to:

Selliner See (Neukloster)
Selliner See (Rügen)